The University of Minnesota Law School is the law school of the University of Minnesota in Minneapolis, Minnesota. The school confers four law degrees: a Juris Doctor (J.D.), a Master of Laws (LL.M.), a Master of Science in Patent Law (M.S.P.L.), and a Doctor of Juridical Science (S.J.D.). The J.D. program offers a number of concentration opportunities, as well as dual and joint degree options with other graduate and professional schools of the university.

Founded in 1888, the University of Minnesota Law School is consistently ranked among the best law schools in America, and was ranked 21st by the 2023 U.S. News & World Report "Best Law Schools" rankings. The law school ranks 17th, tied with Cornell Law School, in graduates securing the most coveted United States Supreme Court clerkships in recent years.

The law school has 704 professional students, the vast majority of whom are members of the J.D. program, and the school maintains a 8:1 student-to-faculty ratio. Admission to the law school is highly selective. Half of the Class of 2024 had a GPA above 3.71 and/or an LSAT score above 166.  The five-year average bar exam passage rate was 96.91%, one of the highest in the country.

The school's graduates work in all 50 states and 70 countries around the world. The Class of 2020 alone is practicing in 28 states and Washington, D.C. The school's alumni include a former U.S. vice president, the CEO of Marriott International, Minnesota Supreme Court justices, representatives at the U.S. Congress, and leaders of major nonprofit organizations.

Cost of attendance & employment 
Tuition for the 2020–2021 academic year are $43,704 for residents and $52,560 for non-residents. Over 95% of the students receive financial aid, including scholarships, to help fund their legal education. Law School scholarships are awarded at the time of admission and range from $5,000 to full tuition. The median starting salary for the 2015 graduates entering the private sector was over $115,000, with 93% of the Class of 2015 known to be employed as of March 2016. The most popular destinations for the 2015 graduates were California, Minnesota, New York, Washington, D.C., and Wisconsin.

U.S. Supreme Court clerkships 

The law school ranks 17th, tied with Cornell Law School, in graduates securing the most coveted U.S. Supreme Court clerkships in recent years.  The list of most recent Supreme Court clerks includes Kyle D. Hawkins (Class of 2009), who clerked for Justice Samuel Alito in the 2013 Term, and Amy L. Bergquist (Class of 2007), who clerked for Justice Ruth Bader Ginsburg in the 2010 Term.

Experiential learning 
There are 24 nationally recognized legal education clinics, offering "student attorneys" the opportunity to handle real legal cases under the supervision of teaching attorneys, with over 50 percent of law students participating in at least one clinic program, which is twice the national average. In 2015, the law school's faculty and students, working in the Center for New Americans, took a case all the way up to the U.S. Supreme Court and won a landmark decision that changed the law in the area of immigration.

Over 95 percent of second-year J.D. students participate in either a moot court or legal journal, such as the Minnesota Law Review. According to the prestigious law journal rankings recently released by Washington and Lee University School of Law, the Minnesota Law Review, currently celebrating its 100th volume, ranks 9th among all law reviews. Two journals were ranked at the very top in their subject areas: Law and Inequality (JLI) for family law and the Minnesota Journal of Law, Science & Technology (MJLST) for energy law.

JLI has been the highest-ranked family law journal for four straight years. It also ranked 3rd in minority, race and ethnic issues, 7th in gender, women, and sexuality, and 20th in public policy, politics, and the law.

MJLST has been the highest-ranked energy law journal for eight consecutive years. MJLST was also ranked 3rd in health law, 4th in environmental, natural resources, and land use, 8th in science, technology, and computing, and 10th in intellectual property.

The Minnesota Journal of International Law ranked 16th among all international law journals, moving up from 23rd in 2014. The ABA Journal of Labor & Employment Law is now ranked 4th for employment law. The law school's faculty-edited journal, Constitutional Commentary, was ranked 2nd in legal history and 9th in constitutional law.

The school's students have won the prestigious Burton Award for Legal Achievement nine times, making the law school one of only seven schools to have received these distinguished writing awards eight or more times.

Current prominent faculty 
The University of Minnesota Law School includes some of the most accomplished and influential scholars in the world. The school was ranked 15th among U.S. law schools, tied with the University of Michigan Law School, for the number of times its tenured faculty's published scholarship was cited in legal journals during the period 2010 through 2014.

History 
The school was originally housed in Pattee Hall, named after the school's first dean, William S. Pattee, who served from 1888 to 1911. Pattee's personal books become the law library's first collection. In 1928 the school moved to Fraser Hall, named after Prof. Everett Fraser who served as dean from 1920 to 1948. In 1978 the school moved to its present building, originally named the Law Center. In 1999–2001, the law school initiated and completed an expansion of its facilities on the west bank of the university campus.  This larger building was renamed Walter F. Mondale Hall in honor of one of its most distinguished alumni, former vice president Walter Mondale ('56).

Along with Harvard Law School, the University of Minnesota Law School founded the Center for Computer-Assisted Legal Instruction (CALI) in 1982. CALI has grown to include the membership of nearly every law school in the US and the organization still has offices at the University of Minnesota Law School.

The law school's 11th dean is Professor Garry W. Jenkins, formerly associate dean for academic affairs at The Ohio State University Moritz College of Law and chief operating officer and general counsel of the Goldman Sachs Foundation.

Law Library
The Law Library, with over 1 million volumes, is the 7th largest of its kind in the United States.  It is open to law students 24 hours a day throughout the year. Of particular note is the Riesenfeld Rare Books Research Center, which houses one of the top three collections of rare legal texts in the nation. For its millionth volume, the law school acquired the papers of Clarence Darrow.

Study abroad programs
The law school offers a number of study abroad opportunities and, in 2006 opened a summer study program for J.D. students in Beijing.  The program was originally conducted with the China University of Political Science and Law, and after two years it was changed to Renmin University (People's University) in Beijing.

The school also features semester exchange programs with ESADE Faculty of Law in Barcelona, Spain; University of Uppsala, Uppsala, Sweden; Université Jean Moulin (Lyon III) in Lyon, France, Humboldt University in Berlin, Germany; University College Dublin in Dublin, Ireland, Tilburg University Faculty of Law in Tilburg, Netherlands, Bocconi University in Milan, Italy; and Bucerius Law School in Hamburg, Germany.  In Fall 2006, the law school announced a new exchange partnership with the Universidad de Montevideo in Montevideo, Uruguay.

Student life

Musical

An annual highlight for the law school is when the student body puts on its own full-length musical: written, performed, directed and produced by the all-student Theatre of the Relatively Talentless (T.O.R.T.).  Begun in 2002, the event draws over a thousand audience members each year and features cameos by distinguished alumni and other distinguished members of the Minnesota legal community.  For the 2006 show, "West Bank Story" (a spoof on "West Side Story"), tickets sold out within three days.  Previous shows include: "The Wizard of Fritz" (2003); "Law Wars" (2004); "Walter Wonka and the Lawyer Factory" (2005); "West Bank Story" (2006);  "Frankenlaw" (2007); "Robin Hood, Esq." (2008); "It's a Wonderful Law School" (2009); "A Midsemester Night's Dream" (2010); "Harry Torter and the Magical Law School" (2011); "Alawddin: The Tale of 1001 All-Nighters" (2012); "Back to the Future Interest" (2013); "Clue: A Murder Mystery in Mondale" (2014); "Froze-In" (2015); "Minnesota Jones and the Law School of Doom" (2016); "The T.O.R.T. Producers" (2017); and "Top Gunner" (2018). T.O.R.T. performed "Tale as Old as Time" March 29 and 30, 2019, at the Pantages Theater in downtown Minneapolis. T.O.R.T.'s production of "Lord of the Ranks" was cancelled after COVID-19 made a show impossible. In 2021, T.O.R.T.'s production of "Super Smash Gophers(SSG)" was filmed at the St. Paul Campus Auditorium and screened in Northeast Minneapolis. Participants are known as the TORTfeasors.

Hockey
The Fighting Mondales hit the ice during the season in intramural play, club play and rivalry games.  In the fall, the Fighting Mondales participate in the University of Minnesota's intramural season, often playing their games at Mariucci Arena on the U of M campus. In the spring, the Fighting Mondales square off against the hockey teams of the three other law schools in the Twin Cities (Hamline University School of Law, the University of St. Thomas School of Law, and William Mitchell College of Law) in an annual competition for the coveted Golden Gavel.

Notable alumni
The law school has about 13,000 living alumni in 50 states and 70 countries, including 275 serving as federal and state court judges nationwide. Perhaps the most famous alumnus of the law school is former Vice President of the United States and U.S. Ambassador to Japan Walter Mondale ('56). The law school's building was renamed Walter F. Mondale Hall in his honor in 2002. His legacy and continued participation in the life of the school earned him a most interesting honor from the school's student-run Law Council: the naming of the mascot of the law school as the "Fighting Mondales." The Law School held the office of Attorney General of Minnesota uninterrupted from another law school from 1929 until 2007.

Other prominent alumni of the school include:

Donald Alsop, federal judge
Ellen Anderson, Minnesota State Senator
G. Barry Anderson, Justice of the Minnesota Supreme Court
Paul H. Anderson, Justice of the Minnesota Supreme Court
Russell A. Anderson, former Chief Justice of the Minnesota Supreme Court
Wendell Anderson, former Governor of Minnesota and United States Senator
LaRoy Baird, North Dakota State Senator
Jack Baker, GLBT activist, first couple to apply for same-sex marriage license in 1970
Dean Barkley, former United States Senator
Henry N. Benson, former Minnesota Attorney General
James H. Binger, former chief executive officer, Honeywell, theater entrepreneur
James J. Blanchard, former Governor of Michigan and U.S. Ambassador to Canada
Kathleen A. Blatz, former Chief Justice of the Minnesota Supreme Court
Willard L. Boyd, former president, University of Iowa and Field Museum of Natural History
Leland Bush, judge of the District Court of Minnesota. 
Guy Branum, comedian.
Nancy E. Brasel, federal judge
Myron Bright, former judge, U.S. Court of Appeals for the Eighth Circuit
David R. Brink, former president, American Bar Association
Harrison A. Bronson, former justice, North Dakota Supreme Court
Quentin N. Burdick, son of Usher L. Burdick and former United States Senator
Usher L. Burdick, former United States Representative, Lieutenant Governor of North Dakota, and father of Quentin N. Burdick
Edward T. Burke, former justice, North Dakota Supreme Court
J. A. A. Burnquist, former governor of Minnesota
Harlan J. Bushfield, former Governor of South Dakota and United States Senator
William Canby, Judge, U.S. Court of Appeals for the Ninth Circuit
Phil Carruthers, former Speaker of the Minnesota House of Representatives
Ray P. Chase, former United States Congressman (did not graduate)
Caroline A. Crenshaw, commissioner of the United States Securities and Exchange Commission
Satveer Chaudhary, former Minnesota State Senator
Theodore Christianson, former governor of Minnesota and United States Congressman
Theodore Christianson, former justice, Minnesota Supreme Court
Frederick A. Cina, lawyer and Minnesota state representative
Michael Ciresi, trial lawyer
Frank Claybourne, president of the Minnesota State Bar Association (1979–1980) and general counsel of the Republican Party of Minnesota (1950–1974)
Alden W. Clausen, former president, World Bank
Laura Coates, legal analyst for CNN
Lawrence D. Cohen, former mayor of Saint Paul, Minnesota
Chris Coleman, Mayor of Saint Paul, Minnesota
Jay Conison, dean of law, Charlotte School of Law, past dean of law, Valparaiso University
Mary Jeanne Coyne, former justice, Minnesota Supreme Court
Charles M. Dale, former Governor of New Hampshire
Norris Darrell, former president, American Law Institute
Michael J. Davis, federal judge
Scott H. DeLisi, United States Ambassador to Nepal
John P. Devaney, former Chief Justice of Minnesota
Everett Dirksen, former United States Senator (did not graduate)
Joel Dobris, professor of law, University of California, Davis
David S. Doty, federal judge
David Durenberger, former United States Senator
Judi Dutcher, former Minnesota State Auditor
Keith Ellison, Minnesota Attorney General, the first Muslim elected to the United States Congress
Franklin Ellsworth, former United States Representative
Matt Entenza, former Minnesota House Minority Leader
Ralph J. Erickstad, former Chief Justice, North Dakota Supreme Court
Joan Ericksen, judge, U.S. District Court for the District of Minnesota
William S. Ervin, former Attorney General of Minnesota
Paul Feinman, judge, New York Court of Appeals
Donald M. Fraser, former United States Congressman and Mayor of Minneapolis, son of University of Minnesota Dean of Law Everett Fraser.
Orville Freeman, former governor of Minnesota
Neil Fulton, Dean, University of South Dakota Law School, Federal Public Defender for the District of South Dakota and District of North Dakota
Frank T. Gallagher, former justice, Minnesota Supreme Court
Thomas F. Gallagher, former justice, Minnesota Supreme Court
Sandra Gardebring Ogren, former justice, Minnesota Supreme Court
Ernest Gellhorn, former dean of law, Arizona State University, Case Western Reserve University, and the University of Washington
James H. Gilbert, former justice, Minnesota Supreme Court
Michael J. Glennon, Professor of Law and Diplomacy, Tufts University
Godfrey G. Goodwin, former United States Representative
Thomas Eugene Grady, former justice, Washington Supreme Court
Henry Norman Graven, former federal judge
Terrance Hanold, former president of the Pillsbury Company
Mike Hatch, former Minnesota Attorney General
William Hawkland, former chancellor of Louisiana State University
Douglas M. Head, former Minnesota Attorney General
Gerald Heaney, former judge, U.S. Court of Appeals for the Eighth Circuit
Thomas B. Heffelfinger, notable United States Attorney
Samuel D. Heins, United States Ambassador to Norway
James L. Hetland Jr., former professor of law, University of Minnesota
Einar Hoidale, former United States Congressman
Melissa Hortman, Minnesota State Representative
Marshall Houts, author
Hubert "Skip" Humphrey, former Minnesota Attorney General and Minnesota State Senator
Natalie Hudson, justice, Minnesota Supreme Court
John Hutson, Dean, University of New Hampshire School of Law and former Judge Advocates General of the Navy
Sly James, Mayor of Kansas City, Missouri
Scott W. Johnson, conservative blogger
B. Todd Jones, Chief Disciplinary Officer, National Football League, former director of the Bureau of Alcohol, Tobacco, Firearms and Explosives (ATF) and U.S. Attorney for the District of Minnesota
Samuel L. Kaplan, United States Ambassador to Morocco
Stephen F. Keating, former president, Honeywell
Fallon Kelly, former justice, Minnesota Supreme Court
Roger G. Kennedy, polymath best known for being director of the Smithsonian Institution's National Museum of American History and director of the National Park Service
Janine Kern, justice, South Dakota Supreme Court
Katherine Kersten, conservative columnist
Ron Kind, United States Congressman (D-WI)
Robert Kingsley, former dean, USC Law, and California appellate judge
Oscar Knutson, former Chief Justice of Minnesota
Richard H. Kyle, federal judge
Joan Ericksen Lancaster, former justice, Minnesota Supreme Court
Earl R. Larson, former federal judge
Jane Larson, former professor of law, University of Wisconsin–Madison
Thomas E. Latimer, former mayor of Minneapolis, Minnesota
George E. Leach, former mayor of Minneapolis, Minnesota
Harold LeVander, former governor of Minnesota
Ernest W. Lewis, former justice, Arizona Supreme Court
John Lind, former governor of Minnesota
Henry Linde, former North Dakota Attorney General
Lee Loevinger, former justice, Minnesota Supreme Court
Miles Lord, former Minnesota Attorney General and U.S. District Court Judge
Charles Loring, former Chief Justice, Minnesota Supreme Court
Brett H. Ludwig, federal judge
Ernest Lundeen, former United States Senator
William Paul Luther, former United States Congressman
Tom McDonald, former U.S. Ambassador to Zimbabwe
Clark MacGregor, former United States Representative
George MacKinnon, former judge, U.S. Court of Appeals for the District of Columbia Circuit
Harry H. MacLaughlin, former federal judge
Patrick J. McNulty, WWII fighter pilot and former United States Bankruptcy Court judge
James Manahan, former United States Representative
Carlos Mariani, Minnesota State Representative (did not graduate)
Harry S. Martin, former librarian and professor of law, Harvard University
Edmon Marukyan, member of the National Assembly of Armenia
Leroy E. Matson, former justice, Minnesota Supreme Court
Robert W. Mattson, Sr., former Minnesota Attorney General
Richard C. Maxwell, former dean of law, UCLA
J. E. Meyers, former mayor of Minneapolis, Minnesota
Geoff Michel, Minnesota State Senator
Clarence B. Miller, former United States Representative
William D. Mitchell, former Attorney General of the United States
Richard Moe, former president, National Trust for Historic Preservation
Walter Mondale, former Vice President of the United States and United States Ambassador to Japan.
Ann D. Montgomery, federal judge
Wayne Morse, former United States Senator
Mee Moua, former Minnesota State Senator
Joe Mullery, Minnesota State Representative
Diana E. Murphy, Judge, U.S. Court of Appeals for the Eighth Circuit
Leonard Murray, former president, Soo Line Railroad
Grant S. Nelson, former professor of law, UCLA
Philip Neville, former federal judge
Constance Berry Newman, former United States Assistant Secretary of State for African Affairs
Walter Newton, former United States Representative
Gunnar Nordbye, former federal judge
Dave Olin, former Minnesota State Representative
Julius J. Olson, former justice, Minnesota Supreme Court
James C. Otis, former justice, Minnesota Supreme Court
Mabeth Hurd Paige, one of the first four-woman elected to Minnesota Legislature in 1923
Alan Page, Pro Football Hall of Famer and justice of the Minnesota Supreme Court
Byron S. Payne, South Dakota Attorney General
Mary Pawlenty, former First Lady of Minnesota and former judge
Tim Pawlenty, president, Financial Services Roundtable and former governor of Minnesota
Byron S. Payne, former Attorney General of South Dakota
Harry H. Peterson, former Minnesota attorney general and justice of the Minnesota Supreme Court
John S. Pillsbury, Jr., former president, Northwestern National Life Insurance Company
Maynard Pirsig, former dean, University of Minnesota Law School, former temporary justice of the Minnesota Supreme Court, and father of Robert M. Pirsig
Daniel D. Polsby, dean of law, George Mason University
Albert F. Pratt, former Minnesota Attorney General and member of Minnesota House of Representatives
J. A. O. Preus, former governor of Minnesota
William Prosser, former dean of law, University of California, Berkeley, author of Prosser on Torts
Milton D. Purdy, former federal judge, served on United States Court for China
William John Quinn, former president, Milwaukee Road
Greg Raymer, 2004 World Series of Poker Champion
A. J. Rockne, former Speaker of the Minnesota House of Representatives and longest serving member
Walter F. Rogosheske, former justice, Minnesota Supreme Court
James M. Rosenbaum, federal judge
Christian Rosenmeier, former Minnesota State Senator
Edward Rustad, former Minnesota State Senator
Millard Ruud, former executive director, Association of American Law Schools and former associate dean of law, University of Texas-Austin
Allan Ryan, Director of Intellectual Property, Harvard Business School Publishing, Harvard University
Elmer Ryan, former United States Representative
Lee Seokwoo, associate professor of law, Inha University and former Research Scholar, Oxford University
Irving S. Shapiro, former CEO, DuPont
Robert Sheran, former chief justice of Minnesota
Harry A. Sieben, former Speaker of the Minnesota House of Representatives
Gerald Edward Sikorski, former United States Congressman
Steve Simon, Minnesota State Representative
John E. Simonett, former justice of the Minnesota Supreme Court
Ballard F. Smith, former president, San Diego Padres
George Ross Smith, former United States Representative
Arne Sorenson, CEO of Marriott International
Warren Spannaus, former Minnesota Attorney General
Harold Stassen, former governor of Minnesota; former president, University of Pennsylvania
Nancy Staudt, dean of law, Washington University in St. Louis
Melvin Steen, founding partner, Cleary Gottlieb Steen & Hamilton
Leslie Stein, judge, New York Court of Appeals
Robert Stein, former executive director, American Bar Association, former dean, University of Minnesota Law School
McCants Stewart, first African American LL.M. recipient, first African American lawyer in Oregon
Royal A. Stone, former justice of the Minnesota Supreme Court (did not graduate)
Thomas O. Streissguth, former justice, Minnesota Supreme Court
Edward C. Stringer, former justice, Minnesota Supreme Court
George F. Sullivan, former federal judge
Michael P. Sullivan, former president, Dairy Queen
Leo A. Temmey, former Attorney General of South Dakota
Dave Thompson, Minnesota State Senator
Nick Thompson, MMA Fighter
John J. Todd, former justice, Minnesota Supreme Court
John R. Tunheim, federal judge
Azhar Usman, Standup Comic
Bruce Marion Van Sickle, former federal judge, member of North Dakota House of Representatives
Charles Joseph Vogel, former judge, U.S. Court of Appeals for the Eighth Circuit
William W. Ward, former member of the Wisconsin State Assembly
Charlie Weaver, Jr., former Minnesota state representative, governor's Chief of Staff
John Francis Wheaton, first African American graduate, first African American member of the Minnesota Legislature
Benson Whitney, former United States Ambassador to Norway
Samuel B. Wilson, former justice, Minnesota Supreme Court
Ryan Winkler, Minnesota State Representative
Sandra Casber Wise, former First Lady of West Virginia
Michael A. Wolff, former chief justice, Supreme Court of Missouri, present dean of Saint Louis University School of Law
Michael W. Wright, former CEO, Supervalu
Lawrence R. Yetka, former justice of the Minnesota Supreme Court
George M. Young, former United States Representative

References

External links 
University of Minnesota Law School mainpage

 
University of Minnesota
Law School
Universities and colleges in Minneapolis
M
1888 establishments in Minnesota